Exyra semicrocea, the pitcher plant mining moth, is a moth of the family Noctuidae. It is found from Northern North Carolina south to Florida west to Texas and New Jersey.

The wingspan is 16–26 mm.

The larvae feed on Sarracenia minor, Sarracenia rubra, Sarracenia alata, Sarracenia leucophylla and Sarracenia psittacina.

External links
 Species info

Plusiinae